The Torriani Award is given annually by the International Ice Hockey Federation (IIHF) to an ice hockey player with an "outstanding career from non-top hockey nation". It was inaugurated in 2015, and is awarded alongside the annual IIHF Hall of Fame induction ceremony at the Ice Hockey World Championships. It is named for Bibi Torriani, who played internationally for the Switzerland men's national ice hockey team. Recipients of the Torriani Award are inducted into the IIHF Hall of Fame into their own category, separate from other players, referees and builders.

When the award was first announced, IIHF president René Fasel was quoted as saying; "we wanted to create a trophy which honours players for a great international career irrespective of where they played. Nowadays, with NHL players and international players often being the same, we feel that there are so many top players to honour. Still, we wanted to ensure we recognized players who didn’t necessarily win Olympic and World Championship medals but who still had remarkable careers. As a result, we created the Torriani Award, and Lucio Topatigh is a very worthy first recipient".

Recipients

See also
Paul Loicq Award

Notes

References

Awards established in 2015
Ice hockey-related lists
Ice hockey trophies and awards